Rsayevo (Rsay) is a rural locality (a selo) and the administrative centre of Rsayevsky Selsoviet, Ilishevsky District, Bashkortostan, Russia. The population was 926 as of 2010. There are 9 streets.

Geography 
Rsayevo is located 13 km south of Verkhneyarkeyevo (the district's administrative centre) by road. Yunny is the nearest rural locality.

References 

Rural localities in Ilishevsky District